The 2002 PSA Men's World Open Squash Championship is the men's edition of the 2002 World Open, which serves as the individual world championship for squash players. The event took place in Antwerp in Belgium from 6 December to 14 December 2002. David Palmer won his first World Open title, defeating John White in the final.

Seeds

Draw and results

Finals

Top half

Section 1

Section 2

Bottom half

Section 1

Section 2

See also
PSA World Open
2002 Women's World Open Squash Championship

References

External links
World Open 2002 Squashtalk page
PSA World Open 2002 website

World Squash Championships
M
2002 in Belgian sport
Sports competitions in Antwerp
Squash tournaments in Belgium
International sports competitions hosted by Belgium
December 2002 sports events in Europe
2000s in Antwerp